A.V. Roe may refer to:

 Alliott Verdon Roe, British aircraft pioneer and manufacturer
 A.V. Roe and Company (generally known as Avro): British aircraft manufacturer founded by Alliott Verdon Roe
 A.V. Roe Canada (known as Avro Canada): Canadian subsidiary of Hawker Siddeley (the parent of Avro)